The 1965 Giro di Lombardia cycling race took place on 16 October 1965, and was won by Peugeot-Michelin BP's Tom Simpson, becoming the first British winner. It was the 59th edition of the Giro di Lombardia "monument" classic race.

Results

References

External links
 

Giro di Lombardia
Giro di Lombardia, 1965
Giro di Lombardia
1965 Super Prestige Pernod